Bellfield is a rural locality in the Shire of Croydon, Queensland, Australia.

Geography
The Norman River rises in the locality and runs west before forming a small section of the western boundary.

Road infrastructure
The Richmond–Croydon Road crosses the south-western corner in two places.

References 

Shire of Croydon
Localities in Queensland